European Parliament elections were held in Croatia on 25 May 2014.

The country formed a single constituency, with members elected by proportional representation using open lists.

Opinion polls

Seat projections

Results

Elected lists and candidates

References

External links
Results of 2014 elections, Croatia

Croatia
2014
2014 in Croatia
2014 elections in Croatia